Marzban was an official title for a political and/or military leader in charge of a border province of the Parthian or Sasanian Empire.

List of Sasanian marzbans

References

Lists of Iranian military personnel
Sasanian generals
Officials of the Sasanian Empire